Marcos "Marquinhos" Garbellotto Silveira Pedroso (born 4 October 1993) is a Brazilian professional footballer who plays as a left back for Liga I club CS Mioveni.

Career

Figueirense FC 
He made his professional debut for Figueirense FC at age 18. During his career in Figueirense, he was loaned out many times. In 2013 he was loaned to Guarani FC, and in 2014 he was loaned to Gremio. In 2017, Marquinhos played in Turkey, while being loaned to Gaziantepspor. Later that year he was loaned to Ferencvárosi TC in Hungary.

FC Dallas 
Pedroso was signed by FC Dallas on 5 July 2018. He was waived by FC Dallas on 3 May 2019. He played a total of 15 MLS games for Dallas.

D.C. United 
Pedroso joined D.C. United on 3 May 2019 after United traded their 2020 MLS SuperDraft first round pick in exchange for $100,000 GAM from FC Dallas.
He debuted against Sporting KC on 12 May 2019, where Pedroso and D.C. went on to win 1–0. D.C. United did not exercise his contract option after the 2019 season.

Botev Plovdiv 
Pedroso signed with Bulgarian side, Botev Plovdiv in July 2020. He made his debut on 9 August 2020, in a 2–0 win over Lokomotiv Plovdiv.

Viitorul Constanța 
On 4 March 2021, Pedroso joined Liga I side, Viitorul Constanța.

Liepāja 
In July 2021, he joined Virslīga club Liepāja.

Mioveni 
On 2 February 2023, Pedroso joined Romanian Liga I side Mioveni.

Personal life 
He is a dual citizen of Brazil and Italy.

Honours

Club
Figueirense
Campeonato Catarinense: 2014, 2015

FK Liepāja
Latvian Football Cup runner-up: 2021

Individual
 Campeonato Catarinense Best Newcomer: 2014

References

External links

1993 births
Living people
Brazilian people of Italian descent
Sportspeople from Santa Catarina (state)
Association football defenders
Brazilian footballers
Campeonato Brasileiro Série A players
Süper Lig players
Nemzeti Bajnokság I players
Major League Soccer players
First Professional Football League (Bulgaria)
Liga I players
Latvian Higher League players
Figueirense FC players
Guarani FC players
Esporte Clube Novo Hamburgo players
Grêmio Foot-Ball Porto Alegrense players
Gaziantepspor footballers
Ferencvárosi TC footballers
FC Dallas players
D.C. United players
Botev Plovdiv players
FC Viitorul Constanța players
FK Liepāja players
CS Mioveni players
Expatriate footballers in Hungary
Expatriate footballers in Turkey
Expatriate soccer players in the United States
Expatriate footballers in Bulgaria
Expatriate footballers in Romania
Expatriate footballers in Latvia
Brazilian expatriate sportspeople in Hungary
Brazilian expatriate sportspeople in Turkey
Brazilian expatriate sportspeople in the United States
Brazilian expatriate sportspeople in Bulgaria
Brazilian expatriate sportspeople in Romania
Brazilian expatriate sportspeople in Latvia